Girolamo Maiorica (1591–1656) was a 17th-century Italian Jesuit missionary to Vietnam. He is known for compiling numerous Roman Catholic works written in the Vietnamese language's demotic chữ Nôm script, both on his own and with assistance from local converts. Maiorica was one of the first authors of original Nôm prose. His works are seen as a milestone in the history of Vietnamese literature.

Biography
Maiorica was born in Naples, probably in 1581, 1589, or 1591. He entered the Jesuit order on 19 May 1605. He was ordained a priest by Cardinal Robert Bellarmine in Rome before heading to Lisbon en route to the Far East in 1619.

Maiorica initially stopped in Goa, then arrived in Macau, intending to proselytize in Japan. However, by 1619, Japan had begun persecuting Christians, so he went instead to Makassar and remained there for a year. Afterwards, he returned to Macau and traveled to Fai-Fo (present-day Hội An) in 1624 in the same boat as Alexandre de Rhodes, João Cabral, and two or three other Jesuits. Whereas de Rhodes studied Vietnamese under Francisco de Pina (1585–1625), Maiorica studied Vietnamese at the Jesuit residence in Nước Mặn (today An Nhơn District, Bình Định Province). He proselytized in Đàng Trong (Cochinchina) from 1628, when his superiors sent him back to Macau en route to a new assignment in Japan. He was again unable to make the journey, this time due to poor weather. In 1630, he traveled to Champa, where he was quickly imprisoned. After a Portuguese merchant ransomed him, Maiorica made his way to Cửa Hàn (Danang) via Cambodia.

On 19 October 1631, he went to Thăng Long (Hanoi) with Bernardino Reggio. The next year, Maiorica and Reggio started a printing press to print copies of Matteo Ricci's Chinese-language work, The True Meaning of the Lord of Heaven, as well as a defense of the faith by Francesco Buzomi. The press was destroyed within several months. Maiorica left Thăng Long for Kẻ Rum, in Nghệ country (present-day Nghệ An), to seek converts in the hinterlands. He stopped writing in the early 1640s to focus on his pastoral duties. In the early 1650s, he returned to Thăng Long to serve as the superior of the Tonkin missionary region. In 1653, he was promoted to provincial of the Jesuits' Japan Province (which included Tonkin, Đàng Trong, Makassar, Cambodia, and Hainan island). Although this province was officially based out of Macau, Maiorica administered it from Thăng Long. In January 1656, he fell ill in Thanh Hóa and died on 27 January 1656 in Thăng Long.

Linguistic influence
All but one of the extant, 17th-century Christian works written in chữ Nôm can be positively attributed to Maiorica. These works are seen as a vital resource for research into chữ Nôm, as well as historical dialects, vocabulary, and phonology of Vietnamese. To translate Catholic theological concepts, Maiorica favored plain, commonly understood vocabulary over Sino-Vietnamese vocabulary, even in cases where the latter would have been consistent with the terms used by his Jesuit colleagues in China.

Scholarship
Historians made reference to Maiorica's works as early as the mid-17th century. Not long after he died, two official Jesuit publications, one published circa 1660–1673 and the other in 1676, also listed manuscripts under his name. For nearly three centuries after that, Western scholars paid very little attention to him. Philipphê Bỉnh (Felippe do Rosario), a Vietnamese Jesuit priest who spent his final years in Lisbon, provided additional important information about Maiorica's works. Apart from this, no new details emerged from then until the mid-20th century.

A major milestone in research on Maiorica occurred in 1951 when Jesuit historian Georg Schurhammer published an article regarding three early Christian authors in Vietnam: Maiorica, João Ketlâm (Gioan Thanh Minh), and Felippe do Rosario. However, he was unaware that copies of Maiorica's works remain.

Schurhammer's investigation was of interest to researcher Hoàng Xuân Hãn, who was in Europe at the time and read the article. He coincidentally encountered a set of manuscripts that he considered very likely to have been written by Maiorica. This discovery elicited excitement among Vietnamese historians, and several individuals published transliterated reproductions of these works. In the half century since then, progress has been made in verifying the authenticity of, preserving, transliterating, and publishing Maiorica's works, which once were assumed to be completely lost.

Bibliography
Maiorica "left a significant body of writings", being credited as the main author of 45 or 48 Nôm works. Exchanges of letters between Jesuits and from the text itself make clear that the works were written with the assistance of Vietnamese converts. Almost all of these contributors were catechists (called ); they were literate and were usually esteemed members of the community before they converted to Christianity. Maiorica's works can be divided into four basic genres: hagiographies, stories adapted from scripture, sermons, and catechetical writings. These works were generally written in prose, except for some prayers written in verse. He translated, adapted, or composed works based on a variety of sources: official Church documents (such as the Vulgate and Roman Missal), writings by Church Fathers, Thomas Aquinas' Summa Theologica, works by fellow Jesuits, and hagiographical books and lore.

Today, only 15 of Maiorica's works remain, totalling 4,200 pages and 1.2 million Nôm characters. A majority is archived in the Bibliothèque nationale de France in Paris.

Maiorica's works are titled in literary Chinese, even though the contents are written in chữ Nôm.

 Thiên Chúa thánh giáo khải mông  (1623) – based on the Italian-language catechism by Robert Bellarmine
 Ông Thánh I-na-xu truyện  [Story of St. Ignatius] (1634)
 Các Thánh truyện  [Stories of the Saints] (1646)
 Truyện Chúa Giê-su  [Story of the Lord Jesus] – based on the Gospels
 Thiên Chúa thánh mẫu  [The Lord's Holy Mother]
 Dọn mình trước chịu Cô-mô-nhong [Preparing for Communion]
 Thiên Chúa thánh giáo hối tội kinh  [The Lord's Holy teachings: prayers of penitence]
 Qua-da-giê-si-ma, mùa ăn chay cả  Quadragesima, the season of fasting]
 Những điều ngắm trong những ngày lễ trọng quyển chi nhất [First book High Holy Days]
 Sách gương phúc gương tội (lost)
 Kinh đọc sớm tối [Matins and Vigil Prayers] (lost)

Additionally, Philipphê Bỉnh states in his writings that Maiorica also participated in an effort to translate the prayers of the Mass into Vietnamese.

See also
 History of writing in Vietnam

References

Further reading
 
 Quốc Dũng, Nguyễn(2009). Ngôn Ngữ trong “Truyện Các Thánh” của Maiorica – Khía cạnh Từ Vựng và Ngữ Pháp (The Language in "The Story of Saints" of Majorica - The Aspects of the Lexicon and Syntax), Master's thesis, University of Hue.
 
 
 
 
 
 
  Translation of 

1591 births
1656 deaths
17th-century Italian Jesuits
Italian Roman Catholic missionaries
Jesuit missionaries in Vietnam
Jesuit missionaries in Indonesia
Italian expatriates in Vietnam
Italian expatriates in Indonesia